Aliabad (also Romanized as ‘Alīābād; also known as ‘Alīābād-e Neyzār) is a village in Neyzar Rural District, Salafchegan District, Qom County, Qom Province, Iran. At the 2006 census, its population was 318, in 82 families.

References 

Populated places in Qom Province